Garimberti, Ferdinando
(6 January 1894 –  26 March 1982) was an Italian violin maker.

Garimberti was born in Mamiano di Traversetolo.  He studied with Romeo Antoniazzi, then Riccardo Antoniazzi; he then worked for Giuseppe Pedrazzini and Leandro Bisiach, and later set up independently in Milan. 
Between 1927 and 1949 his instruments won important awards at the exhibitions held at Rome and Cremona. He taught at the International School of Cremona from 1963 to 1966. He died in Milan.

During his long career his models and style remained almost unvaried. His work is meticulous, very precise and clean, always extremely careful and very elegant. He was discriminating in his choice of wood and he clearly preferred to fashion the backs out of one piece. He applied the varnish with great skill; this varies in consistency and colour depending on the period. The most usual colour is a beautiful red-orange which sometimes becomes lighter towards the centre but is sometimes a darker red. 
He also did much repair work and was considered an expert in old Italian violins. He often marked his instruments with a signed label and a brand on the inside.

"Ferdinando Garimberti, along with Ansaldo Poggi and Giuseppe Ornati, are considered the top 3 modern Italian makers of the 20th century. Many soloists, past and present, own Garimberti and Poggi instruments as they function as good facsimile Stradivaris and Guarneris. As we have seen in the recent sold prices of instruments by Ferdinando Garimberti, Ansaldo Poggi, and Giuseppe Ornati, their investment potential is huge." Poesis String Studio & Violin Experts

References

External links
La Liuteria Italiana / Italian Violin Making in the 1800s and 1900s - Umberto Azzolina
 
La Liuteria Lombarda del '900 - Roberto Codazzi, Cinzia Manfredini  2002
Dictionary of 20th Century Italian Violin Makers - Marlin Brinser 1978 
 
 
Walter Hamma, Meister Italienischer Geigenbaukunst, Wilhelmshaven 1993, 
 Liuteria Parmense

View a  fine example of Ferdinando Garimberti  violin Milan  circa 1931    close-up:
        Ferdinando Garimberti  Violin    Milan  1931 top
        Ferdinando Garimberti  Violin    Milan  1931 back
        Ferdinando Garimberti  Violin    Milan  1931 scroll

1894 births
1982 deaths
Businesspeople from Milan
Italian luthiers
20th-century Italian musicians